Picerno is a town and comune in the province of Potenza, in the Southern Italian region of Basilicata. It is bounded by the comuni of Balvano, Baragiano, Potenza, Ruoti, Savoia di Lucania, Tito, and Vietri di Potenza.

References 

Cities and towns in Basilicata